Didcot Parkway is a railway station serving the town of Didcot in Oxfordshire, England. The station was opened as Didcot on 12 June 1844 and renamed Didcot Parkway on 29 July 1985 by British Rail to reflect its role as a park and ride railhead.

Just to the north of the station is the Didcot Railway Centre, which is accessed through the station. The centre is a comprehensive exhibition of original Great Western Railway rolling stock, with demonstration running tracks and including a reconstructed station named Didcot Halt.

History
During this period a stagecoach transported passengers to Oxford from Steventon. A few weeks later the line was extended to Faringdon Road station near West Challow, and eventually to Bristol. On 12 June 1844 the line from Didcot to Oxford was opened and Didcot station was opened at the junction. The original intended route would have taken a line from Steventon to Oxford via Abingdon, but Abingdon's townspeople objected to this idea. Otherwise, it is unlikely that Didcot would have evolved into the town it is today, as its initial growth was prompted by the coming of the railway.

In its latter years it was reduced to a rural backwater before its closure just before the Beeching cuts. The DN&S was closed to passengers on 10 September 1962 and to freight in 1967. At the eastern end of Platform 1, there is a raised section of the east car park, which used to be the bay platform for the DN&S line.

In 1985, a new main building for the station was built along with a new 600-space car park on the site of the former provender store to the west of the station for Park and Ride use. These were opened on 29 July 1985 by David Mitchell MP, Parliamentary Under Secretary of State for Transport, and on that date the station was renamed Didcot Parkway.

In 2018, a multi-storey car park was opened, costing £20 million and increasing the number of spaces by 65% to 1800. The car park also has a sheltered footbridge.

In 2021, a new cycle storage hub was constructed, providing 600 covered spaces, LED lighting, CCTV cameras and a bike repair station. The project cost £1m, and was completed by a partnership of GWR, DfT and Network Rail.

Stationmasters

John Peach 1860 - 1865 (formerly station master at Hungerford, afterwards station master at Reading) 
George Bland 1868 - 1872
Henry Maggs 1872 - 1878 (formerly station master at Dorchester West, afterwards station master at Newton Abbot)
Henry Larkcom/Larkam 1878 - 1881 (formerly station master at Lydney, afterwards station master at Reading)
Charles William Noble 1881 - 1882 (formerly station master at Stourbridge, afterwards station master at Birmingham)
H.C. Evans ca. 1885 - 1908
J. Short 1908 - 1912 (afterwards station master at Banbury)
Thomas Frederick Edwin Jakeman 1916 - 1917 (afterwards station master at Dorchester West)
Arthur Meddows Taylor ca 1928 - 1930 (formerly station master at Stroud, afterwards station master at Swindon)
T.G. Curnow 1930 - ca. 1941
William Ferguson Brown 1950 - 1956 (afterwards station master at Reading)
R. Hyatt ca. 1960

Layout

Platforms

The station is located just to the north of the town centre in Didcot. It can only be accessed by car from Station Road itself on the south side of the railway, although passengers may park in Foxhall Road Long Stay Car Park, situated on Basil Hill Road, and cross a footbridge to the station. The station entrance is at road level; platforms 2-5 may be accessed by lifts, while platform 1 may be accessed from the ramp to the left of the station building near the taxi rank. All services are operated by Great Western Railway.
Platform 2 – Up (eastbound) express services to London Paddington.
Platform 3 – Down (northbound) local services to Oxford,  and Banbury.
Platform 4 – Up local services to Reading and London Paddington, 
Platform 5 – Down (northbound) local services to Oxford, Banbury and Moreton-in-Marsh.

Junctions and yards

Didcot is a junction between the Great Western Main Line (GWML) and the route to Oxford and the Midlands. A marshalling yard is opposite platform 5 and another was once provided at Moreton, a little to the east. Moreton is still a junction, allowing trains to pass between the main lines on the south, and the relief and Oxford lines on the north. An avoiding line runs from Didcot East Junction, behind the marshalling yard and the Didcot Railway Centre, allowing trains to Oxford to run through without blocking the station platforms. The track was lifted in 1967.

The junction at the west end of the station which is accessible from platforms 3, 4, and 5 (the Oxford bound platforms) is known as Chester Line Junction. This is so called because that was as far at the Great Western Railway could take you from here.

West of the station is Foxhall Junction which allows freight trains from Oxford to travel towards Swindon.  Immediately beyond this two goods lines diverge on the north side of the line. The first served a loop for Merry-go-round trains that used to deliver coal to Didcot Power Station. The second serves the Milton Freight Terminal, though this line is not in regular use.  Beyond this the four main and relief lines merge into three at Foxhall Junction and after a small loop just before Steventon, the four lines pass under the A34 and become two lines as far as the old station at Wantage Road.

Improvement programme 2012
An improvement programme for the forecourt of the station began in September 2012 and ran for two years. Key features include:

 Larger taxi rank with covered waiting area
 Dedicated drop-off and pick-up area
 Short-stay waiting bays
 Disabled parking with step-free access
 Secure cycle parking and motorcycle parking
 Pedestrian piazza with seating and a glazed atrium and walkways
 Extra bus stops with electronic real-time information
 An improved East Car Park
 Better security with CCTV and new lighting
 New drainage to alleviate flooding
 Completion of a cycle route serving the station

Electrification
As part of the 21st-century modernisation of the Great Western Main Line, the GWML was electrified to just west of Didcot Parkway in January 2018. It was extended west to Swindon in November 2018. It was originally proposed that the Oxford line also be electrified, however cost overruns resulted in this being deferred. As a result, Didcot Parkway has seen an increase in the number of terminating services with Class 387s electric multiple units connecting at Didcot with British Rail Class 165 / 166 diesel multiple units.

Services
There is no local service west of Didcot, so local service is exclusively provided by local trains taking the line to Oxford. However, a proportion of the main line services to Bristol and South Wales do stop here, with the remainder passing through the station non-stop. Fast trains to and from the Oxford line can avoid the station using the Didcot East curve.

Didcot Parkway was served by some CrossCountry services until 2003 when Virgin CrossCountry ceased to call at the station, with all services using the Didcot East curve to and from the Oxford line. As at December 2018, one late night CrossCountry service from Reading to Birmingham New Street passes through Didcot Parkway to allow drivers to retain route knowledge. Passenger services on the West Curve ceased after Thames Trains Oxford to Bristol Temple Meads service was withdrawn in 2003.

Didcot Parkway was planned to be on East West Rail, connecting the GWML, Chiltern Main Line, West Coast Main Line, Midland Main Line and Greater Anglia together. It was planned that people will change here for connections to/from Bristol Temple Meads and South Wales. , services were not planned to extend beyond Oxford. An hourly service to/from Bristol was recommended in the June 2021 Oxfordshire Rail Corridor Study (page 8, diagram for morning peak), as well as an hourly service between Banbury and Bristol.

Accidents and incidents
On 13 February 1861, a passenger train ran into the rear of a freight train at Didcot Junction. The guard of the freight train had failed to adequately protect the rear of his train.
On 26 September 1873, a freight train was derailed whilst being shunted to allow a passenger train to pass.
On 6 January 1932 a milk train and a freight train collided at Didcot East. The locomotive of the milk train was derailed and six tankers were slightly damaged. Ten wagons of the freight were wrecked and seventeen more were damaged. The milk train had overrun a danger signal.
On 14 August 1964 LMS Stanier Class 8F locomotive 48734 collided with a train of tank wagons at Didcot North Junction. Eleven of them were derailed and caught fire. The locomotive was severely damaged by the fire and was consequently scrapped.
On 1 January 1966 a freight train was derailed.
On 3 February 2007 a passenger train caught fire. All 400 passengers were evacuated.

See also
 List of Parkway railway stations

Notes

References

External links
 Didcot Parkway information page on National Rail website
 

Railway stations in Oxfordshire
DfT Category B stations
Great Western Main Line
Railway stations in Great Britain opened in 1844
Former Great Western Railway stations
Railway stations served by Great Western Railway
Didcot